Andrew Zinni  (born 6 March 1965) is an Australian former international soccer player who most notably played for Brunswick Juventus and Preston Macedonia in the National Soccer League (NSL). Zinni played 17 times for the Australia national soccer team, including 10 times in full international matches.

Andrew's son, Stefan Zinni, is also a professional footballer.

Honours
With Australia:
 Trans-Tasman Cup: 1986. 1987 (runners-up)
 President's Cup: 1987 (runners-up)
 Merlion Cup: 1990
With Brunswick Juventus:
   NSL Championship: 1985
Personal honours:
 NSL Player of the Year: 1987 with Brunswick Juventus

References

External links
OzFootball profile

1965 births
Living people
Soccer players from Melbourne
Australia international soccer players
National Soccer League (Australia) players
Brunswick Juventus players
Association football forwards
Australian soccer players
Preston Lions FC players